Mount Scowden is an 11,182-foot-elevation (3,408 meter) summit located in the Sierra Nevada mountain range, in Mono County of northern California, United States. The mountain is set less than three miles east of the Sierra crest, within the Hoover Wilderness, on land managed by Inyo National Forest. Precipitation runoff from this mountain drains to Mill Creek, and ultimately Mono Lake. The mountain's toponym has been officially adopted by the United States Board on Geographic Names and has been in publications since at least 1882. Leo A. Scowden (born 1848) was a mining engineer and United States deputy mineral surveyor for California who resided in Bodie, Mono County. There were several mining claims on Mt. Scowden in the 1800s which gave rise to the gold rush camp of Lundy.

Mining

Gold and silver mining claims on Mt. Scowden:

 May Lundy
 Homer
 Harrison
 Last Chance
 Lucky Mortan
 Bay Queen
 Bryant
 Gray Eagle
 Gorilla
 Parrott
 Tamarack
 Wolverine
 Mono
 Ontario Syndicate

Climate
Mount Scowden is located in an alpine climate zone. Most weather fronts originate in the Pacific Ocean, and travel east toward the Sierra Nevada mountains. As fronts approach, they are forced upward by the peaks (orographic lift), causing moisture in the form of rain or snowfall to drop onto the range.

See also

 Lundy, California

Gallery

References

External links
 Weather forecast: Mount Scowden

Mountains of Mono County, California
North American 3000 m summits
Mountains of Northern California
Sierra Nevada (United States)
Inyo National Forest